South Central (Music from the Original Motion Picture Soundtrack) is the original soundtrack to Stephen Milburn Anderson's 1992 film South Central. It was released on September 18, 1992 via Hollywood Basic and consisted of a blend of hip hop, R&B and soul music. The album itself did not make it to any Billboard charts, but its single, Classic Example's "It's Alright", has peaked at #68 on the Billboard Hot 100.

Track listing

References

External links

1992 soundtrack albums
Soul soundtracks
Hip hop soundtracks
Hollywood Records soundtracks
Drama film soundtracks